Fr. Anthony (Tony) Collier, (1913-1950), was an Irish Catholic missionary priest, a member of Missionary Society of St. Columban (the Columban Fathers). He was killed by North Korean forces on 27 June 1950, the first non-Korean killed during the Korean War.

Tony Collier was born on 20 June 1913 in Clogherhead, County Louth, Ireland. He was educated at Christian Brothers in Drogheda (1921-1926) and St. Patrick's College, Armagh (1926-1931). He joined the Columbans in Dalgan Park in 1931 and was ordained there in 1938. Fr. Collier went on mission to Korea in 1939.

Fr Collier was in charge of the second Columban parish in Chunchon, Korea, when he was taken into custody by North Korean soldiers, questioned, and killed on 27 June 1950.  Fr. Collier is buried in Gangwon-do, South Korea, along with Irish Bishop Thomas Quinlan and other missionaries.

References

1913 births
1950 deaths
People from County Louth
20th-century Irish Roman Catholic priests
Missionary Society of St. Columban
20th-century executions by North Korea
Irish people executed abroad
Military personnel killed in the Korean War